Dingleton Hospital was a mental health facility in Melrose, Scotland. The former boiler house is a Category B listed building.

History
The hospital, which was designed by Brown & Wardrop, opened as the Roxburgh, Berwick and Selkirk District Asylum in May 1872. A new female hospital block was completed in 1898 and two new wings, designed by Sydney Mitchell and Wilson, were completed in 1906. The facility joined the National Health Service as Dingleton Hospital in 1948. A monolithic concrete boiler house, designed by Peter Womersley, which still dominates the local skyline, was completed in 1977.

After the introduction of Care in the Community in the early 1980s, the hospital went into a period of decline and closed in 2001. The main building has since been converted for residential use as "Dingleton Apartments" within a wider housing development across the former hospital site known as "Trimontium Heights".

References

Hospitals in the Scottish Borders
Hospital buildings completed in 1872
1872 establishments in Scotland
Hospitals established in 1872
2001 disestablishments in Scotland
Hospitals disestablished in 2001
Former psychiatric hospitals in Scotland
Defunct hospitals in Scotland